The Journalist, published in Thimphu, is an English language weekly newspaper published in Bhutan. It was launched in December 2009. The Journalist is Bhutan's fifth private newspaper.

External links
 The Journalist celebrates 3rd birthday

References

Newspapers published in Bhutan
English-language newspapers published in Asia
Publications established in 2009
2009 establishments in Bhutan